Ball-Hog or Tugboat? is the 1995 debut solo album by American musician Mike Watt, previously known for his work as the bass guitarist and songwriter for the punk rock groups Minutemen and fIREHOSE. 

The title references the difference between being a team player or being a glory hog. Watt explained it as "Are you going to be the tugboat which helps boats dock in rough surf safely? Or are you going to be like some glory hound who shoots the fucking ball every time you get it?" Watt recorded the album with a rotating cast of alternative rock all-stars.

Background 
It was recorded in 1994, and came at a personal and professional career crossroads for Watt.  fIREHOSE had broken up after eight years and six releases earlier in 1994, and his marriage to Kira Roessler (former Black Flag bassist) had ended in divorce, though they remained on good terms and worked as a duo in Dos; Kira also contributed some computer graphics to the album's artwork.

Without a full-time band, Watt recruited a wide variety of friends and fellow travelers to participate in the recording of the album. These included fellow SST Records alumni like former Black Flag vocalist Henry Rollins, members of Sonic Youth, Curt and Cris Kirkwood of the Meat Puppets, former Saccharine Trust guitarist Joe Baiza, Dinosaur Jr's J Mascis, and former SST house producer Spot. Other contributors included members of bands who had either toured with and/or been influenced by the Minutemen and Firehose, including Pearl Jam's Eddie Vedder, Nirvana's Krist Novoselic and Dave Grohl (making their first recorded appearance on a record since Kurt Cobain's death), Jane's Addiction and Porno for Pyros drummer Stephen Perkins, Red Hot Chili Peppers's Flea, Bikini Kill's Kathleen Hanna, Soul Asylum's Dave Pirner, former Germs and Nirvana guitarist Pat Smear, former Pixies singer Frank Black, former The Screamers and Twisted Roots keyboardist Paul Roessler (who was Watt's brother-in-law), The Lemonheads frontman Evan Dando, The Circle Jerks' Zander Schloss, former Screaming Trees vocalist Mark Lanegan and guitarist Gary Lee Conner, jazz/punk guitarist Nels Cline and his drummer Michael Preussner, that dog's Petra and Rachel Haden and Anna Waronker, and Mike D and Ad-Rock of the Beastie Boys. Also participating on the album were Parliament/Funkadelic organist Bernie Worrell, Carla Bozulich of the Geraldine Fibbers, Vince Meghrouni and Tony Atherton from the jazz band Bazooka and Bruce Hornsby drummer John Molo.

In interviews and on his online tour journals, Watt has nicknamed Ball-Hog... "The Wrestling Album", as he considered the various lineups we worked with on the album as "people getting into the ring" with him.  Watt has also mentioned in interviews that professional wrestling is one of the few things he regularly watches on television (He once named The Magnificent Muraco as a favorite wrestler.) Watt's longtime friend, artist Raymond Pettibon (another wrestling fan), added to the wrestling theme by contributing to the artwork a panel cartoon with the caption "Sex with you is like watching scientific wrestling".

Singles

"Big Train" was the first single from the album and one of only two songs Watt sang lead vocal on (the other being the closing track, "Coincidence Is Either Hit Or Miss".)  The album's other singles, "Against The 70's" and "Piss-Bottle Man", featured Eddie Vedder and Evan Dando on lead vocals respectively. The initial plan was for Vedder to sing on a cover of Captain Beefheart's "Dirty Blue Gene" but at the last minute they decided to record "Against the 70s" instead. All three of the singles were airplay hits on both modern rock and college radio, with "Against The 70's" peaking at #21 on the Billboard Modern Rock Tracks chart. Videos were also shot for "Big Train" and "Piss-Bottle Man"; the former video originally featured models of Union Pacific trains in the footage, which was blurred out in a subsequent version of the clip after the company raised a copyright objection.

As part of the label's push behind the album, Columbia released the album as a limited-run double-vinyl LP, pressed on deep blue vinyl, and in a limited edition cardboard 12-inch by 6-inch sleeve that included both the standard CD insert as well as a second CD booklet that contained a "glossary of Pedro slang".

Tour
Watt assembled an all-star grouping for his initial tour for the album in early 1995, attracting a great deal of attention from the alternative music press.  Watt was backed by Vedder on guitar and vocals, Smear on guitar, William Goldsmith on drums, and Dave Grohl alternating on guitar and drums.  The tour also featured Vedder's band Hovercraft and the Foo Fighters on their first national tour.  Watt's ensemble performed on The Jon Stewart Show during this tour. Special guests such as Carla Bozulich and Perry Farrell appeared at select shows.

A May 1995 tour date in Chicago was recorded and later released as "Ring Spiel" Tour ’95.

Later in the year Watt toured with a four-piece nicknamed The Crew Of The Flying Saucer with guitarist Nels Cline and two drummers, Michael Preussner and Vince Meghrouni, who served as an opening act for Primus on their 1995 US tour.

Track listing 
All tracks composed by Mike Watt; except where indicated

 "Big Train" (Tony Kinman, Chip Kinman) – 3:21
 "Against the 70's" – 3:28
 "Drove Up from Pedro" – 4:32
 "Piss-Bottle Man" – 3:16
 "Chinese Firedrill" (Watt, Joe Carducci) – 3:25
 "Intense Song for Madonna to Sing" – 3:05
 "Tuff Gnarl" (Sonic Youth) – 3:10
 "Sexual Military Dynamics" (Watt, Henry Rollins) – 2:39
 "Max and Wells" – 3:11
 "E-Ticket Ride" – 4:27
 "Forever... One Reporter's Opinion" – 3:41
 "Song for Igor" – 2:46
 "Tell 'em Boy!" – 3:29
 "Sidemouse Advice" – 3:31
 "Heartbeat" – 5:34
 "Maggot Brain" (George Clinton, Eddie Hazel) – 12:05
 "Coincidence Is Either Hit or Miss" – 2:20

Personnel 
 Mike Watt			- 	Bass, Lead Vocals, Background Vocals, Spoken Word
 Dave Grohl		- 	Drums, Guitar
 Nels Cline		- 	Guitar, Slide guitar, Lead Guitar, Nylon Guitar
 Eddie Vedder		- 	Guitar, Lead Vocals, Background Vocals
 J Mascis			-	Guitar, Drums
 Cris Kirkwood		-	Banjo
 Curt Kirkwood		-	Lead Guitar
 Gary Lee Conner	-	Lead Guitar
 Krist Novoselic		-	Farfisa Organ
 Carla Bozulich		-	Vocals, Background Vocals
 Michael Preussner	-	Drums
 Joe Baiza			-	Guitar
 Paul Roessler		-	Piano
 Danny Frankel		-	Percussion
 Spot	-	Mandolin, Viola
 Evan Dando			-	Vocals
 Bob Lee	-	Drums
 Zander Schloss		-	Guitar
 John Strohm		-	Guitar
 Anna Waronker		-	Background Vocals
 Petra Haden		-	Background Vocals, Violin
 Rachel Haden		-	Background Vocals
 Frank Black		-	Vocals
 Keith McCaw		-	Acoustic Guitar
 Stephen Perkins		-	Percussion, Drums
 Thurston Moore		-	Guitar
 Lee Ranaldo		-	Guitar
 Steve Shelley		-	Drums
 Epic Soundtracks		-	Tambourine
 Henry Rollins		-	Vocals
 Wayne Griffin		-	Drums
 Butler	-	Guitar
 Mark Lanegan		-	Vocals
 Brock Avery		-	Drums
 Todd Rigione		-	Guitar
 Michael Diamond	-	Vocals
 Tony Atherton		-	Alto Saxophone
 Coco Hayley Gordon Moore	-	Background Vocals
 Flea	-	Lead Bass, Pocket Trumpet
 John Molo		-	Drums
 Vince Meghrouni	-	Percussion, Background Vocals, Vocals, Drums, Tenor Saxophone
 Pat Smear		-	Vocals
 Dave Pirner		-	Vocals
 Tiffany Anders		-	Vocals
 Richie West		-	Drums
 Kathleen Hanna		-	Spoken Word
 Bernie Worrell		-	B3 Organ
 Adam Horovitz		-	Drums, Guitar, Background Vocals
 Ronda Rindone		-	Bass clarinet
 Mario Caldato Jr.	-	Background Vocals
 Tony Maxwell		-	Cello

Track credits
The album liner notes list the following performers by track:

References and footnotes

External links 
 Mike Watt's Hoot Page
 Glossary Of Pedro Slang (from sonymusic.com)

1995 debut albums
Mike Watt albums
Columbia Records albums
Albums recorded at Robert Lang Studios